Bopparder Maschinenbau-Gesellschaft mbH, better known by the acronym BOMAG, is a German company and a global market leader in compaction technology and manufactures soil, asphalt and refuse compaction equipment, as well as stabilizers and recyclers. In 2005 BOMAG was acquired by the Fayat Group and since then also sells asphalt pavers and cold planers under the BOMAG label.

Company history 
BOMAG was founded in 1957 by Karl Heinz Schwamborn in Boppard. In the same year he developed a new design for compaction technology for a model of a double vibratory roller with all-drum drive.

In 1962 the first 7t double vibratory roller in the world was launched. The first branch office abroad opened in 1961 in Austria, followed by branches in China, the USA, France, Italy, Great Britain, Canada, Japan and Hungary up to 2002.

In 1970 Schwamborn sold the company to the American company Koehring.

The original site in Boppard was no longer adequate, so the company moved in 1969 to the Hellerwald industrial estate in the district of Buchholz (Boppard) where it remains today. A research centre was added seven years later. In 1982 production and steel engineering operations on the 7,000 m² site were expanded. Four years later a further 10,000 m² were developed for assembly, testing and painting heavy machinery. A powder coating plant was installed in 1997, and the site expanded again by 9,000 m² in 1998.

Koehring sold its interest in BOMAG in 2001 to the American company SPX Corporation, which in turn sold the company again in 2005 to the French corporate group Fayat. In July 2009, BOMAG shed around 320 jobs worldwide, 160 of which were in Boppard, due to an unprecedented 50 percent drop in turnover that year.

Company information 
BOMAG produces a range of 20 product groups and has 500 dealers in more than 120 countries. With around 1200 employees (as of 2010) in Boppard, the company is one of the largest employers in the region.

References 

Further reading

External links 

 

Companies based in Rhineland-Palatinate
Manufacturing companies established in 1957
Heavy equipment
Machine manufacturers
1957 establishments in West Germany
Construction equipment manufacturers of Germany